Genetic sexual attraction is a theory that attraction may be a product of genetic similarities.  There is 
"little scientific evidence" for the position, and at least some commentators regard the hypothesis as pseudoscience. The term is also used for a supposed phenomenon in which biologically related persons separated at a young age develop intense feelings—including sexual attraction—upon the restoration of contact.

Background 
The term was popularized in the United States in the late 1980s by Barbara Gonyo, the founder of Truth Seekers in Adoption, a Chicago-based support group for adoptees and their new-found relatives. Gonyo first heard the term used during an American Adoption Congress conference in the early 1980s. She developed sexual feelings for her son when she met him after he was adopted away, but he did not want to be part of any such contact.

Because many traits are at least partially determined by genetics, genetic sexual attraction is presumed (according to those who believe in the concept) to occur as a result of genetic relatives meeting as adults, typically as a consequence of adoption. However, this is a very rare outcome of adoptive reunions.

Another suggested explanation for the phenomenon is possible narcissistic feelings.

Incest is extremely rare between people raised together in early childhood due to a reverse sexual imprinting known as the Westermarck effect, which desensitizes them to later close sexual attraction. It is hypothesized that this effect evolved to prevent inbreeding.

Direct studies
Although reported frequently as anecdote in the field of psychology, there are no studies showing that people are sexually attracted to those genetically similar to them. Studies of MHC genes show that unrelated people are less attracted to those genetically similar to them. However, in mice, this lack of attraction can be reversed by adoption. While it has been documented that sexual attraction can occur between related individuals in some cases, it is not clear that calling this attraction GSA is appropriate.

Criticism
Critics of the hypothesis have called it pseudoscience. Amanda Marcotte of Salon has stated that the term is nothing but an attempt at sounding scientific while trying to minimize the taboo of incest. She also opined that many news outlets have handled reports of the subject poorly by repeating what the defenders of the hypothesis have said as opposed to actually looking into the research on the supposed phenomenon. She states that most of the publications which have chosen to run stories of couples speaking about "genetic sexual attraction" are not legitimate news sources. As example, she refers to New York Magazine's Science of Us blog publishing an interview with a woman in an incestuous relationship that simply reads like a story of a young girl who has been groomed by her father. The use of "GSA" as an initialism has also been criticized, since it gives the notion that the phenomenon is an actual diagnosable "condition". Eric Anderson, sociologist and sexologist, states that the one single academic research paper on the subject uses "Freudian psycho-babble".

Catherine MacAskill, an adoption and child sexual abuse expert, stated that "although [...] concerns are understandable [for adoptees and biological parents]" before attempting a reunion, one who researches the subject will realize that so called "genetic sexual attraction" cases seem to be associated with sudden unplanned meetings which lack the proper safeguards of a thoroughly prepared reunion.

See also 
 Assortative mating, preferential mating between individuals with similar characteristics

References

Citations

Sources

Further reading
 
 

Adoption reunion
Incest
Sexual attraction
Pseudoscience